Catherine Cool Rumsey is an American politician and was a Democratic member of the Rhode Island Senate representing District 34 from 2013 to 2014.

Education
Cool Rumsey earned her BS in sociology from Nazareth College and her MS in quality management from Anna Maria College.

Elections
2012 To challenge District 34 Republican Senator Francis Maher, Cool Rumsey was unopposed for the September 11, 2012 Democratic Primary, winning with 488 votes, and won the November 6, 2012 General election with 7,150 votes (55.1%) against Senator Maher.

Rumsey was defeated in her 2014 bid for re-election by Republican Elaine Morgan.

References

External links
Official page at the Rhode Island General Assembly

Catherine Cool Rumsey at Ballotpedia
Catherine Cool Rumsey at the National Institute on Money in State Politics

Place of birth missing (living people)
Year of birth missing (living people)
Living people
Anna Maria College alumni
Nazareth College (New York) alumni
Politicians from Providence, Rhode Island
Democratic Party Rhode Island state senators
Women state legislators in Rhode Island
21st-century American politicians
21st-century American women politicians